"Imagine Me in the Maginot Line" (sometimes "Imagine Me on the Maginot Line") is a 1939 comedy song written by Harry Gifford and Fred E. Cliffe for the comedian George Formby. Formby recorded it on 17 December for Regal Zonophone Records. The title refers to the Maginot Line, a large defensive fortification in northern France, constructed to withstand assault from Nazi Germany. Formby voices a member of the British Expeditionary Force stationed to defend France during the Second World War.

The song was a hit, and Formby performed it when entertaining British troops. Popular during the Phoney War of 1939 to 1940, the song rapidly dated when the Germans attacked and successfully conquered France, with the remains of the BEF being evacuated from Dunkirk.

References

Bibliography
 Blake, Eric Charles. Wars, Dictators and the Gramophone, 1898-1945. William Sessions, 2004.
 Buckton, Henry. Retreat: Dunkirk and the Evacuation of Western Europe. Amberley Publishing, 2017.
 Morley, Nathan. Disney's British Gentleman: The Life and Career of David Tomlinson. The History Press,  2021.

British songs
1939 songs
George Formby songs
Songs written by Harry Gifford (songwriter)
Songs written by Fred E. Cliffe